Royère-de-Vassivière (literally Royère of Vassivière) is a commune in the Creuse department in the Nouvelle-Aquitaine region in central France.

Geography
The rivers Maulde and Thaurion rise within the borders of the commune.
The commune lies within the regional park of the Millevaches, an area of the 1000 sources, not cows.

Population

Sights

 The church of St. Germain, dating from the thirteenth century.
 The Ceres fountain, opposite the church.
 The Lac de Vassiviere.
 The Lac de Lavaud-Gelade.
 The Modern Art Centre on the l'île de Vassivière.
 The Sculpture Park: 30 monumental sculptures by French and oversees artists.

See also

Communes of the Creuse department

References

External links
Website of the Communauté de Communes of Bourganeuf and Royère de Vassivière 

Communes of Creuse